Jean Dalby Clift was an American priest of the Episcopal Church and a pastoral counselor in private practice. She was the author of books in the fields of psychology and spirituality. "Dr. Clift has had many roles in her life, including lawyer, spiritual director, pastoral counselor, author, lecturer, workshop presenter, priest, mother, grandmother, and poet." She lectured and gave workshops in the United States, Australia, Europe, Asia and Africa on such topics as pastoral counseling, prayer, spiritual growth, journaling, pilgrimage, and the Myers-Briggs Type Indicator. Three of her five books were co-authored with her husband, the Reverend Wallace Clift.

Early career and education
Born February 21, 1930, in Texas, Clift received a B.A. (1950) and J.D. (1952) from the University of Texas at Austin. She practiced law at Baker, Botts, Andrews and Parish in Houston, Texas, and in 1954 married another attorney at the firm, Wallace Clift. After her husband went to seminary, Jean Clift became involved in prayer ministry. In 1964, Jean and Wallace Clift were awarded a joint grant by the Farish Foundation to study the psychology of Carl Jung. At the C. G. Jung Institute in Zürich, Switzerland, she studied for two years with analyst Marie-Louise von Franz, to whom she dedicated one of her books.

Academic career
Clift applied her psychological training to the study of literature, earning a Ph.D. from the University of Denver in 1978 with the dissertation Little Nell and the lost feminine: An archetypal analysis of some projections in Victorian culture. She co-founded the C. G. Jung Society of Colorado in 1976, and remains a trustee. From 1975 to 1980, Clift was the first non-Catholic to hold the position of Director of the Center for Religious Meaning at Loretto Heights College.  She also served as a faculty advisor for Loretto Heights' University Without Walls program for re-entry students, and taught short courses in religious studies and the humanities. In 1980, she was elected president of the American Academy of Religion, Rocky Mountain-Great Plains Region. After Clift left Loretto Heights in 1980, she continued her involvement with teaching as an adjunct professor of Anglican studies until 2002, first at St. Thomas Seminary and then at the Iliff School of Theology. In 2000, the Wallace B. and Jean Dalby Clift Scholarship Fund, to provide funds for students enrolled in Iliff's Anglican Studies Program, was endowed by Bette Lanning in recognition of the contributions made by Clift and her husband.

Pastoral counseling and ministry
Clift left Loretto Heights in 1980 to establish a private counseling practice. She joined the American Association of Pastoral Counselors in 1982, and served as its president from 1994 to 1996. She was ordained a priest in the Episcopal Diocese of Colorado in 1988. She was a member of the Pastoral Intervention Team for the same diocese, where she was also chair of the Pastoral Counseling Guidelines for Clerical Ethics. She gave numerous workshops on pastoral counseling, dream interpretation, journaling, spiritual growth, and pilgrimage. She was Canon Pastor Emeritus of the Episcopal Diocese of Colorado and an associate priest at the Cathedral of St. John in the Wilderness.

Publications

Books
   Australia: .
 
 
  Republished 2004 by Wipf & Stock, . Australia: .

Articles

Poems and prayers

Encyclopedia entries
 Clift, Jean Dalby; Clift, Wallace (2012). "Symbols of Transformation in Dreams" in Encyclopedia of Psychology and Religion. 2nd ed. (Leeming, D., ed.) Berlin Heidelberg: Springer-Verlag

References

1930 births
2020 deaths
American spiritual writers
American Episcopal clergy
University of Texas School of Law alumni
University of Denver alumni
American religious writers
Women religious writers
Psychology writers
Psychologists of religion
Symbologists
People associated with Baker Botts
People from Naples, Texas